Karl, Prince of Leiningen, KG (Karl Friedrich Wilhelm Emich; 12 September 1804 – 13 November 1856) was the third Prince of Leiningen and maternal half-brother of Queen Victoria. Leiningen served as a Bavarian lieutenant general, before he briefly played an important role in German politics as the first Prime Minister of the Provisorische Zentralgewalt government formed by the Frankfurt Parliament in 1848.

Biography

Descent
A member of the Hardenburg branch of the Leiningen family, Karl was born in Amorbach, the son of Prince Emich Carl of Leiningen (1763–1814) by his second marriage with Princess Victoria of Saxe-Coburg-Saalfeld (1786–1861). He was the only son, as Emich Carl's son by his first wife, Friedrich, had died in 1800.

Prince Emich Carl had received the Principality of Leiningen during the German mediatisation (Reichsdeputationshauptschluss) in 1803, as a compensation for the lost Hardenburg estates in the Palatinate occupied by French revolutionary troops, and took his residence at the secularised Amorbach Abbey. The princely territory, however, soon after passed to the newly established Grand Duchy of Baden, the Kingdom of Bavaria and the Grand Duchy of Hesse. Prince Emich Carl died on 4 July 1814 and Karl succeeded him as third Prince of Leiningen. On 11 July 1818, his widowed mother married Prince Edward, the fourth son of King George III of the United Kingdom, at Kew Palace, Surrey. In 1819, Karl and his younger sister, Princess Feodora, were taken from Amorbach to London, where their half-sister, Princess Victoria of Kent, was born on 24 May at Kensington Palace.

Marriage and issue
On 13 February 1829, Karl married the Bohemian Countess Marie von Klebelsberg (27 March 1806 – 28 October 1880), younger daughter of Count Maximilian von Klebelsberg-Thumburg (1752-1811) and his wife, Maria Anna von Turba (1763-1833). They had two sons:

Ernst, Prince of Leiningen (9 November 1830 – 5 April 1904); married Princess Marie of Baden on 11 September 1858. They had two children.
Prince Eduard Friedrich Maximilian Johann of Leiningen (5 January 1833 – 9 April 1914). Never married.

Minor prince
Karl had attended a private school in Bern and from 1821 onwards studied law at the University of Göttingen with the jurist Karl Friedrich Eichhorn, then one of the principal authorities on German constitutional law and leading proponent of the German Historical School of jurisprudence. At the British court, his multifaceted interests in art were aroused. From 1828, he had Waldleiningen Castle near Mörschenhardt (named after Waldleiningen in the Palatinate) erected as his private residence, a Romantic complex resembling Neo-Gothic castles in Britain, such as Abbotsford House.

As a mediatized house, the Princes of the Leiningen were members of the Landtag diet in Baden, as well as in Bavaria and Hesse. Prince Karl became president of the Bavarian upper house (Reichsrat) in 1842 and also pursued a career in the Bavarian Army as Lieutenant general à la suite of the Cavalry. On 20 April 1842, he and 20 other noblemen gathered at Biebrich Palace, where they established the Adelsverein to organize the settlement of German emigrants in Texas; Karl was elected president of the society.

1848: Brief moment of glory
By the German revolutions of 1848–49, Leiningen had achieved much reputation as a liberal reformer and freethinker. He advocated the implementation of parliamentarism and openly criticized aristocracy's privileges; therefore, he was appointed Prime Minister of Revolutionary Germany by Regent (Reichsverweser) Archduke John of Austria on 6 August 1848. With a Catholic head of state and a Lutheran head of government, an equilibrium was reached in German dualism; moreover, Leiningen's close relations to the British Royal House were generally appreciated. His cabinet initially could rely on a liberal and left-wing majority in the newly established Frankfurt Parliament, however, as early as on 5 September, he resigned over the Schleswig-Holstein Question when in the First Schleswig War King Frederick William IV of Prussia unilaterally signed an armistice with Denmark at Malmö. The delegates of the Frankfurt assembly reacted with outrage and Leiningen, unable to assert the powers of the central authority, was forced to step down. He was succeeded by the Austrian politician Anton von Schmerling, who acted as Prime Minister until December.

Later life and death
In 1851, Karl also resigned as president of the Adelsverein and was succeeded by Prince Hermann of Wied. Shortly after his half sister's daughter Victoria became engaged to Prince Frederick of Prussia, in 1855, he suffered a severe apoplectic attack. A second attack in November the following year was fatal, and he died at Waldleiningen Castle at the age of fifty-two, with his sister Feodora at his bedside.

Upon hearing of her half-brother's death, Queen Victoria wrote in her journal:

Honours
 :
 Grand Cross of the Zähringer Lion, 1823
 Grand Cross of the House Order of Fidelity, 1825
 : Grand Cross of the Royal Guelphic Order, 1824
 : Knight of St. Hubert, 1825
 : Knight of the Rue Crown, 1825
    Ernestine duchies: Grand Cross of the Saxe-Ernestine House Order, April 1834
 : Grand Cross of the Tower and Sword, 3 June 1836
 : Knight of the Garter, 14 July 1837
 : Grand Cross of the Ludwig Order, 4 August 1840

Ancestry

References

 Hermann Nehlsen (1997) (in German) Fürst Karl zu Leiningen (1804–1856). In: Gerhard Köbler, Hermann Nehlsen (Ed.): Wirkungen europäischer Rechtskultur. Festschrift für Karl Kroeschell zum 70. Geburtstag. Verlag C.H. Beck, München, S. 763f.
 
 Sarah Tytler, The Life of Her Most Gracious Majesty the Queen, vol. II

External links
 Fürstenhaus zu Leiningen
 Texas State Historical Association

1804 births
1856 deaths
German princes
Princes of Leiningen
Leiningen family
Members of the First Chamber of the Estates of the Grand Duchy of Hesse
Members of the First Chamber of the Diet of the Grand Duchy of Baden
Members of the Bavarian Reichsrat
Knights of the Garter